Pinus longaeva (commonly referred to as the Great Basin bristlecone pine, intermountain bristlecone pine, or western bristlecone pine) is a long-living species of bristlecone pine tree found in the higher mountains of California, Nevada, and Utah. Methuselah is a bristlecone pine that is  years old and has been credited as the oldest known living non-clonal organism on Earth. To protect it, the exact location of this tree is kept secret. In 1987, the bristlecone pine was designated one of Nevada's state trees.

Description
The bark is bright orange-yellow, thin and scaly at the base of the trunk. The leaves show the longest persistence of any plant, with some remaining green for 45 years (Ewers & Schmid 1981).

The cones open to  broad when mature, releasing the seeds immediately after opening.

These ancient trees have a gnarled and stunted appearance, especially those found at high altitudes, and have reddish-brown bark with deep fissures. As the tree ages, much of its vascular cambium layer may die. In very old specimens, often only a narrow strip of living tissue connects the roots to a handful of live branches.

The Great Basin bristlecone pine differs from the Rocky Mountain bristlecone pine in that the needles of the former always have two uninterrupted resin canals, so it lacks the characteristic small white resin flecks appearing on the needles of the latter. The green pine needles give the twisted branches a bottle-brush appearance. The name 'bristlecone pine' refers to the dark purple female cones that bear incurved prickles on their surface.

Distribution and ecology

The species occurs in Utah, Nevada and eastern California. In California, it is restricted to the White Mountains, the Inyo Mountains, and the Panamint Range, in Mono and Inyo counties. In Nevada, it is found in most of the higher ranges of the Basin and Range from the Spring Mountains near Las Vegas north to the Ruby Mountains, and in Utah, northeast to South Tent in the Wasatch Range. Due to the inaccessibility of many of the sites that this species occupies, information on their location and abundance is incomplete, and thus is needed.  Environmental niche modelling has been used to better map the distribution of Great Basin bristlecone pine using topographic and spectral variables calculated from a geographic information system (GIS).

The tree grows in large open stands, unlike the related foxtail pine, which sometimes form dense forests. Pinus longaeva trees generally do not form closed canopies, usually covering only 15-50%. Pinus longaeva shares habitats with a number of other pine species, including the ponderosa pine, the white fir and, notably, the limber pine, a similarly long-lived high-elevation species. The tree is a "vigorous" primary succession species, growing quickly on new open ground. It is a "poor competitor" in good soils, however, and the species does best in harsh terrain. Pinus longaeva is often the dominant species in high-elevation dolomite soils, where few plants can grow.

Bristlecone pines are protected in a number of areas owned by the United States federal government, such as the Ancient Bristlecone Pine Forest in the White Mountains of California and the Great Basin National Park in Nevada. These areas prohibit the cutting or gathering of wood.

Clark's nutcrackers pluck P. longaeva seeds out of the opening cones. The nutcrackers use the seeds as a food resource, storing many for later use in the ground, and some of these stored seeds are not used and are able to grow into new plants.

An introduced fungal disease known as white pine blister rust (Cronartium ribicola) is believed to affect some individuals. The species was placed on the IUCN Red List and listed as "Vulnerable", or threatened, in 1998. In 2011, however, a population survey found the population of Pinus longaeva to be stable, with no known subpopulations decreasing in size. White pine blister rust was found to have a negligible effect on the population. As a result, the species was moved to "Least Concern".

Fire ecology

The tree is extremely susceptible to fire, and is damaged by even low-intensity burns. The resinous bark is capable of igniting quickly, and a crown fire will almost certainly kill the tree. However, populations of Pinus longaeva are known to be extremely resilient, and as a primary succession species, it is believed that populations of the tree would reestablish itself quickly after a fire. That said, large-scale fires are extremely uncommon where the species grows, and are not a major factor in the species' long-term viability.  Historically, Pinus longaeva stands experienced low to high severity fires, and fuels structures changed considerably across elevational gradients. In low elevation, mixed species stands, fuels are often heavy and in close proximity to anthropogenic ignition sources. Yet at high elevations near treeline, Pinus longaeva typically grow on limestone outcroppings that provide little or no surface fuels to propagate a wildfire. However, warmer temperatures will likely increase the duration of fire season, and thus the frequency of fire in Pinus longeava systems at low and mid elevations could increase where stands are typically denser and surface fuel is greatest. While rare, wild fires such as The Carpenter 1 fire in southern Nevada (July 2013) and the Phillips Fire in Great Basin National Park, (September 2000) that started in lower elevation fuel types and moved through the crowns of trees with the aid of extreme fire weather, could become more likely.

Age

A specimen located in the White Mountains of California was measured by Tom Harlan, a researcher with the Laboratory of Tree-Ring Research, to be 5,062 years old as of 2010. This would make it the oldest known non-clonal tree in the world. The identity of the specimen was kept secret by Harlan. Harlan passed away in 2013, and neither the tree nor the core Harlan studied have been found, making the age or existence of this tree unable to be confirmed.

The confirmed oldest tree of this species, "Methuselah", is also located in the Ancient Bristlecone Pine Forest of the White Mountains. Methuselah is  years old, as measured by annual ring count on a small core taken with an increment borer. Its exact location is kept secret.

Among the White Mountain specimens, the oldest trees are found on north-facing slopes, with an average of 2,000 years, as compared to the 1,000 year average on the southern slopes. The climate and the durability of their wood can preserve them long after death, with dead trees as old as 7,000 years persisting next to live ones.

See also
 List of superlative trees

References

External links

 
 The ancient bristlecone pine
 Photo of cone (scroll to bottom of page)
 High elevation white pine educational website: Pinus longaeva
 Aeon Magazine longform article on Bristlecone pines

longaeva
Trees of the Southwestern United States
Trees of the Great Basin
Flora of the California desert regions
Flora of the Great Basin
Trees of the Western United States
Negligibly senescent organisms